Numerous vessels have borne the name Fame:

 was built at Bristol as a West Indiaman. Between 1797 and 1799 she made two voyages to India for the British East India Company (EIC). She then made two voyages to Africa as a slave ship. On her return from Africa she resumed her trading with Jamaica. She is last listed in Lloyd's Register in 1807.
 was launched in India. She was sold to Portuguese owners. A French privateer captured but the Royal Navy recaptured her in 1794. She then became a West Indiaman, sailing from Liverpool. Between 1796 and 1804 she made three voyages as a slave ship. She then returned to the West Indies trade. From 1818 on she was a whaler in the Greenland whale fishery, sailing from Whitby and then Hull. She burnt in 1823 while outward bound on a whaling voyage.
 was launched at Bristol and made two voyages for the EIC. On her third voyage a French frigate captured her. She apparently returned to British hands and was last listed in 1811.
 was built at Calcutta; on 27 July 1807 she was lost on the Eastern Sea Reef.
 was built at Quebec and was lost in 1817 after having transported convicts to New South Wales.
 of 204, or 205 tons (bm), was built at Quebec by John Goodie. She traded widely and was last listed in 1833.
 was built in 1816 at Calcutta. She traded between Britain and India and was wrecked in 1822.
 was built at Northfleet in 1818. She made one voyage under charter to the EIC; a fire destroyed her in 1824 during her second voyage for the EIC.

Citations

References

See also
 – one of nine ships of the Royal Navy to bear the name

Ship names